Images is a ballet made by Miriam Mahdaviani for the New York City Ballet's first Diamond Project to Debussy's "Gigues" from Images pour orchestre (1906–12) and "Nuages" and "Fêtes" from his Nocturnes (1893–99). The premiere took place 30 May 1992 at the New York State Theater, Lincoln Center.

Original cast  

Samantha Allen
Elizabeth Drucker
Romy Karz
Julie Michael
Teresa Reyes
Albert Evans 
Arch Higgins
Ben Huys
Jerome Kipper
Sean Savoye
Runsheng Ying

Articles  
May 24, 1992 Jack Anderson, NY Times

Reviews  
 
June 1, 1992 Anna Kisselgoff, NY Times

February 13, 1993 Jack Anderson, NY Times

Ballets by Miriam Mahdaviani
Ballets to the music of Claude Debussy
1992 ballet premieres
New York City Ballet repertory